In terms of per capita income, Connecticut is the richest state in the United States of America. As at 2019, Connecticut had a per capita income of $44,496. All data is from the 2010 United States Census and the 2011-2015 American Community Survey 5-Year Estimates.

Despite its high per capita income, Connecticut is mainly a middle-class state. Most of Connecticut’s wealth is concentrated in Fairfield County, which contains many affluent suburbs in Connecticut. Fairfield County is very close to New York City. Other areas of wealth in the state include suburbs surrounding New Haven and Hartford, as well as pockets of Litchfield County.

Counties

Incorporated county subdivisions

(missing towns of Guilford and Eastford)

References

Connecticut
Economy of Connecticut
Income